Apperley is a surname. Notable people with the surname include:

 Charles James Apperley (1777–1843), English sportsman and sporting writer
 David Apperley, Australian technical diver and cave explorer
 George Owen Wynne Apperley (1884–1960), English painter